The Swan is an historic former Grade II* Elizabethan coaching inn in Tetsworth built about 1600 CE with 17th-century and 18th-century additions.

It is now hosts a restaurant and an antiques business.

References

Coaching inns
Grade II* listed buildings in Oxfordshire
Pubs in Oxfordshire